Coccothrinax acunana, the sierra palm, is a palm which is endemic to Pico Turquino in Cuba.  It grows at high elevations (above 900 m), reportedly higher than any other Cuban palm.  Like other members of the genus, C. acunana is a fan palm.

Andrew Henderson and colleagues (1995) considered C. acunana to be a synonym of Coccothrinax miraguama.

References

acunana
Trees of Cuba
Plants described in 1939